Westward movement may describe:
 
 The ideology of manifest destiny in American history 
 United States territorial acquisitions involving historical expansion of the United States territory westward
 The mural "Westward Movement: Justice of the Plains and Law Versus Mob Rule" by American artist John Steuart Curry